Num-Heavymetallic is the fourth and latest studio album by Japanese rock band Number Girl, released on April 26, 2002. It peaked at number 91 on the Oricon Albums Chart. The band broke up in September 2002 but reunited in 2019.

Track listing

Charts

References

External links
 

2002 albums
Number Girl albums
Albums produced by Dave Fridmann
Albums recorded at Tarbox Road Studios